Marquette County Airport  is a former airport in the Upper Peninsula of Michigan, located in Negaunee Township in Marquette County, several miles west of the city of Marquette. With the 1995 closure of nearby K. I. Sawyer Air Force Base, airport facilities were transferred to Sawyer International Airport when it opened in 1999.

In 2006, the Keweenaw Bay Indian Community proposed moving its Ojibwa II casino from Chocolay Township to the airport site, where it would build a  facility. The proposal was rejected by Governor Rick Snyder, unless a broader agreement could be reached.

References

External links
Photos of the closed Marquette County Airport

Airports in Michigan
Airports established in 1932
Airports disestablished in 1999
Buildings and structures in Marquette County, Michigan
Defunct airports in Michigan
Transportation in Marquette County, Michigan